Le Cadeau, released in Italy as Il regalo, is a 1982 French and Italian  film. It stars  Claudia Cardinale. It is based upon the play written by Italo Terzoli and Enrico Vaime.

Plot
Gregoire is retiring after many years with the same bank, and his colleagues surprise him with the gift of a beautiful call girl, Barbara. Thinking she is a conquest, he impersonates the bank president, leading to a comedy of mistaken identities.

Cast
Pierre Mondy: Grégoire Dufour
Claudia Cardinale:	Antonella Dufour
Clio Goldsmith: Joyane / Barbara
Jacques François: Jacques Loriol
Renzo Montagnani: emiro Fayçal di Krator
Cécile Magnet: Charlotte Legueden
Henri Guybet: André
Rémi Laurent: Laurent
Yolande Gilot: Jennifer
Laurence Badie: Marie-Laure
Christophe Bourseiller: Jean-Philippe Loriol
Duilio Del Prete: Umberto

References

External links

1982 films
Italian sex comedy films
Films scored by Michel Legrand
Films about prostitution in France
Films about prostitution in Italy
Films set in Venice
French sex comedy films
1980s sex comedy films
1982 comedy films
Films directed by Michel Lang
1980s French films
1980s Italian films